Duane Goossen (August 21, 1955) is the former Kansas Secretary of Administration and the Director of the Kansas Division of the Budget. Goossen has served as the Secretary of the Kansas Department of Administration since 2004 and Director of the Kansas Division of the Budget since 1998. Goossen also served in the Kansas House of Representatives 1983 to 1997.

Goossen has a Masters of Public Administration from the Kennedy School of Government, Harvard University, and has served as president of the National Association of State Budget Officers.

External links
 Kansas Department of Administration
 Kansas Health Institute

References

Living people
State cabinet secretaries of Kansas
Republican Party members of the Kansas House of Representatives
Harvard Kennedy School alumni
1955 births
20th-century American politicians
21st-century American politicians